He Has Left Us Alone but Shafts of Light Sometimes Grace the Corner of Our Rooms… is the debut album of Canadian post-rock group A Silver Mt. Zion, who now record under the name Thee Silver Mt. Zion Memorial Orchestra. The album was recorded by guitarist Efrim Menuck and bassist Thierry Amar at the Hotel2Tango in 1999, mostly during breaks while touring with Godspeed You! Black Emperor. It was published by the Montreal-based record label Constellation on March 27, 2000.

The album was born out of a desire by Efrim Menuck to record something for his dog Wanda, who died of cancer while Godspeed You! Black Emperor were on tour. Menuck described the recording of the album as a "Jewish experience", due to his immersion within a small, friend-based Jewish community in Montreal. Indeed, Menuck also stated that, as a result of the community, the album title and songs have a sense of Judaism, although the band tried to not make it conspicuous. There is some Jewish imagery in the lyrics to the track "Movie (Never Made)", but their exact meaning remains cryptic.

The album was initially to be named He Has Left Us Alone, but it was decided that this was too weak, and didn't convey the proper mood. Menuck professed that he was confused with the idea that songs or album titles should only be a few words in length and be perfectly clear. Instead, Menuck believes that things of that nature can be described with many words, giving sensibility and a "frame" to the work.

On the original vinyl release, the songs were arranged into two tracks; on CD releases, the songs were indexed into four parts each, resulting in eight tracks. The sleeve artwork lists inaccurate track times, all rounded to even minutes.

The 5th track "13 Angels Standing Guard 'round the Side of Your Bed" was featured in Harmony Korine's movie Mister Lonely. It also features in Series 3 episode 10 of Top Boy. It was also sampled on the Injury Reserve track “What a Year It's Been” from their 2019 self-titled album.

Reception 
Reviewing the album for Pitchfork, Matt LeMay called the album "an accomplishment of passion, skill, and above all, an almost supernatural talent."

Track listing

Vinyl edition

CD edition

Personnel
A Silver Mt. Zion
Thierry Amar – double bass, bass guitar, production
Efrim Menuck – piano, guitar, organ, vocals, radio, production
Sophie Trudeau – violin, vocals

Other musicians
Aidan Girt – drums on "Sit in the Middle of Three Galloping Dogs", tapes on "For Wanda"
Gordon Krieger – bass clarinet on "Blown-out Joy from Heaven's Mercied Hole"
Sam Shalabi – guitar on "Blown-out Joy from Heaven's Mercied Hole"

References

External links
He Has Left Us Alone but Shafts of Light Sometimes Grace the Corner of Our Rooms… at Constellation Records

Thee Silver Mt. Zion albums
2000 debut albums
Constellation Records (Canada) albums